Eamon Ore-Giron (born 1973) is a Latino visual artist based in Los Angeles, California.  From 2004 to 2013, he was a member of the art collective OJO.  He is a prolific artist who has exhibited at international venues, including the Whitney Biennial and Museum of Contemporary Art, Los Angeles.

Biography 
Eamon Ore-Giron was born 1973 in Tucson, Arizona, to Peruvian and Irish-American parents. He was raised in the southwestern United States and spent time in Spain, Peru and Mexico. Ore-Giron's primary medium is painting, but he works with video and music as well. He performs as his alter-ego DJ Lengua who incorporates global modernism into his work. In 2005, he co-founded the art collective OJO with visual artists Joshua Aster, Justin Cole, Chris Avitabile, Moises Medina, and Brenna Youngblood. OJO created immersive exhibits and performance art which experimented with musical improvisation, electronics, and pushing the boundaries between viewer and performer. They disbanded in 2013. Recently his work has taken on a flat painting style of geometric abstraction. He's artwork is neat and focuses on cultural cross-fertilization. For the last decade, he has been losing the sight in his right eye, and attributes the change is his style to this vision issue. In 2020, he was named to the Presidential Residency at the Anderson Collection at Stanford University.

Education 
Eamon Ore-Giron attended the San Francisco Art Institute and received his Bachelor's of Fine Arts in 1996.  He completed his graduate work at the University of California, Los Angeles where he received his MFA in 2006.

Artwork 
Much of Ore-Giron's work is influenced by indigenous traditions, Russian Suprematism, Native American medicine wheels, Mexican muralism, Amazonian tapestries, European modernism, and Latin American Concrete art. He views his work as an outlet, in which he can show different realities of imagination and be able to reassess history.

He is a founding member of OJO, an audio performance group. He is also known by his musician name, DJ Lengua and has gained success in releasing two vinyl covers with Unicornio Records. He music focuses on Latin American electronic beats. Ore-Giron created a conceptual artwork inspired by  music in 2013, titled E-D-G-B-D-G.It is composed of copper chimes that form a musical scale in the manner of an open tuning system.

Ore-Giron has a series called Infinite Regress. This series started in 2015 and has continued to grow since then. It currently consist of 130 paintings that depict a variety of geometric shapes.

"Soft Power" is an exhibition at the San Francisco Museum of Modern Art that presented Eamon Ore-Giron "Infinite Regress LXXIV" painting. The painting demonstrated his unique and powerful use of color and shapes.

Exhibitions

Collections  
Eamon Ore-Giron's work is in the permanent collection of UCLA Hammer Museum, the Art in Embassies United States Consulate General Nuevo Laredo, Los Angeles County Museum of Art, Museum of Fine Arts in Boston, Pennsylvania Academy of the Fine Arts, San Francisco Museum of Modern Art, and Pérez Art Museum Miami

Honors and awards 
Eamon Ore-Giron was awarded 2020-2021 Presidential Residency for the Future of the Arts.

Publications 
Eamon Ore-Giron created a book called Infinite Regress, that was published in March 2020 by Bom Dia Boa Tarde Boa Noite.  The book shows his series of Infinite Regress paintings and poetry from Edgar Garcia.

References 

1973 births
Living people